The Green Envelope (Spanish:El sobre verde) is a 1971 Spanish musical comedy film directed by Rafael Gil and starring Tony Leblanc, Esperanza Roy and Guadalupe Muñoz Sampedro.

Cast

References

Bibliography 
 Bentley, Bernard. A Companion to Spanish Cinema. Boydell & Brewer 2008.

External links 
 

1970s musical comedy films
Spanish musical comedy films
1971 films
1970s Spanish-language films
Films directed by Rafael Gil
1971 comedy films
1970s Spanish films